The Shadow Factory: The Ultra-Secret NSA from 9/11 to the Eavesdropping on America is a book on the National Security Agency by author James Bamford.

Fort Gordon, Georgia 
Bamford's book contains a description of a processing center at NSA's Fort Gordon, Georgia facility, and Operation Highlander, with which it was associated. The staff there analyzed satellite telephone signals (like Inmarsat) from all over the Middle East. They performed various operations such as matching up phone numbers with names of organizations or individuals, recording messages, finding the locations of cellphones, call chaining analysis, language identification and translation, and assigning 'importance' numbers to the "cuts" (recordings).

Bamford's book contains the statements of people who worked there, including Adrienne J. Kinne and John Berry. Berry says that the operation never violated Americans' rights and contributed a good deal to the war effort. Kinne says that they were listening to the phone calls of Americans in the Middle East making calls back to the States, including NGOs, aid workers, and journalists at the Palestine Hotel. Kinne contrasts her years of work before 9/11 in SIGINT and the careful attention paid to USSID 18 with her work after 9/11 and the way USSID 18 was essentially ignored. Kinne later became part of Iraq Veterans Against the War.

The NSA Inspector General and the US Army Intelligence and Security Command (INSCOM) investigated her allegations. They claimed they 'found insufficient evidence to support Kinne's allegations of improper intelligence activities'. Kinne says the NSA IG never even interviewed her. The Congress also questioned NSA and the Army about the matter.

References

Further reading 
 Christensen, Chris. "Review of The Shadow Factory: The Ultra-Secret NSA from 9/11 to the Eavesdropping on America by James Bamford." (book review) Cryptologia. October 2009. Volume 33, Issue 4. p. 356-358. Detailed record at Academic Search Complete, EBSCOHost.

External links 
 
 After Words interview with Bamford on The Shadow Factory, October 18, 2008

2008 non-fiction books
Books about the National Security Agency
Doubleday (publisher) books